Pikachu is one of the species of Pokémon creatures from the Pokémon media franchise, as well as its mascot.

Pikachu may also refer to:

Entertainment
Pokémon Pikachu, a series of portable Pokémon digital pets
Pokémon Yellow, also known as Pikachu edition, a first-generation Pokémon game
Detective Pikachu (film), a 2019 film directed by Rob Letterman
"Pikachu", a song by Oliver Heldens
"Pikachu (No Keys)", the original name for the song "Yes Indeed" by Lil Baby and Drake
"Pikachu", a song by Yung Lean from Starz
"PIKACHU", a song by the Kid LAROI from F*ck Love

Other uses
Pikachu (sculpture), a sculpture installed in Lower Garden District, New Orleans
Pikachu virus, a computer virus
Yago Pikachu (born 1992), Brazilian footballer
MC Pikachu (born 1999), Brazilian singer

See also 
Picacho (disambiguation)
Pika, a small, mountain-dwelling mammal
Pikchu, a mountain in Peru